The Livingston County Courthouse is an historic building and a longtime judicial center for Livingston County, Illinois, United States. It is located in the county seat of Pontiac.

History
The current Livingston County Courthouse is the third building to carry that name. Construction on the present-day courthouse began in late 1874 and was completed late the next year. The courthouse was built after fire consumed the second Livingston County Courthouse on July 4, 1874. The plan for the courthouse was selected from a slate of ten candidate plans. The County Board of Supervisors noted at the time that the selected plan "cost more money (but) it was the only one which for size, fire-proof qualities, and solidity would answer the purpose, and was indeed, in the matter of taste and elegance, much in advance of any other." However, the author of the 1915 The County Archives of the State of Illinois called the building "hardly fireproof". The courthouse clock tower was installed in 1892.  It served as the county's primary judicial center until late 2011, when a replacement Law and Justice Center opened across the street. It currently houses county offices that are not court-related.

Architecture

John C. Cochrane, a Chicago architect  designed the Livingston County Courthouse in Second Empire style. The building is symmetrical and rectangular, standing two stories tall. Each of its four corners features a tower and there is also a central clock tower topping the building. Some architectural elements found on the structure include: quoins, cornices, a mansard roof, modillions, belt courses and patterned roof tiles. From the basement to the eaves the building stands 55 feet tall and the clock tower sits at 70 feet above the basement.

Historic significance
The Livingston County Courthouse was added to the National Register of Historic Places on November 19, 1986. It was added because it met criteria for inclusion in the areas of politics and government as well as architecture. The building was the seat of judicial activity in Livingston County, Illinois from 1875 until the 21st century, and it is a locally excellent example of Second Empire style.

References

External links

11th Judicial Circuit of Illinois, official site, accessed July 9, 2009.

Courthouse
Clock towers in Illinois
Courthouses on the National Register of Historic Places in Illinois
County courthouses in Illinois
Government buildings completed in 1875
National Register of Historic Places in Livingston County, Illinois
Pontiac, Illinois
Second Empire architecture in Illinois
Tourist attractions in Livingston County, Illinois